Union Settlement is one of the oldest settlement houses in New York City, providing community-based services and programs that support the immigrant and low-income residents of East Harlem since 1895. It is East Harlem’s largest social service agency and serves 10,000 people annually through programs including early childhood education, youth services, senior services, adult education, mental health, small business development and community outreach.

Establishment
Union Settlement was founded in 1895 by members of the Union Theological Seminary Alumni Club. After visiting Toynbee Hall in London, and inspired by the example of Hull House in Chicago, the alumni decided to create a settlement house in the area of Manhattan enclosed on the north and south by East 96th and 110th Streets and on the east and west by the East River and Central Park. Known as East Harlem, it was a neighborhood filled with new tenements but devoid of any civic services. The ethos of the settlement house movement called for its workers to “settle” in such neighborhoods in order to learn first-hand the problems of the residents. "It seemed to us that, as early settlers, we had a chance to grow up with the community and affect its development," wrote William Adams Brown, Theology Professor, Union Theological Society (1892–1930) and President, Union Settlement Association (1915–1919). The long service record of his wife, Helen Gilman Noyes Brown, a social worker for years at the Union Settlement, was recognized in 1919 when she was elected to membership in the National Institute of Social Sciences.

With millions of immigrants arriving in the Union States in the late 19th century as the two elevated subway lines were completed, East Harlem quickly equaled the Lower East Side as Manhattan’s predominantly immigrant community. Until the 1920s, it was New York’s true "Little Italy," claiming the largest population of Italians outside of Italy. The neighborhood had a progressive, reformist commitment: Mayor Fiorello LaGuardia lived in East Harlem, spoke often at Union Settlement, and personified the political activism of the area.

Union Settlement’s work has helped tens of thousands of children, youth, and adults, many of whom have gone on to become leaders in the community and beyond, including New York Secretary of State Lorraine Cortes-Vazquez and City Council Member Robert Jackson. Hollywood movie star Burt Lancaster played sports, acted in theater productions, and learned circus arts at Union Settlement as a boy. He credited Union Settlement for "saving him from the streets," and supported the organization all his life.

History 
In 1895 Union Settlement opened at 202 E. 96th Street, on the second floor of a tenement building. Union Theological Seminary student William E. McCord was appointed its first "headworker" (as its directors were known). It moved twice in 1895 (210 E. 104th Street and 237 E. 104th Street). Several, years later, in 1899 Morris K. Jesup purchased five houses (235-243 E. 104th Street) for the Settlement. McCord's term as headworker ended in 1901 following his resignation, and Gaylord S. White replaced him, eventually serving in that position for 22 years. In 1917, Union Settlement established three campgrounds in Palisades Interstate Park: Camp Nathan Hale for boys, Camp Gaylord White for girls and Camp Ellen Marvin for mothers and young children. The camps exposed tens of thousands of inner-city youngsters, from 1917 to the 1960s, to the natural world. The New York Committee of the American Birth Control League opened a Birth Control Clinic at Union Settlement in 1932. The clinic is one of the earliest in the city and in East Harlem.

During the mid-20th century, Union Settlement services began evolving with the needs of East Harlem. 1957, Union Settlement Federal Credit Union opened its doors for business. The credit union is a financial cooperative where members pool their assets and lend money to each other at low-interest rates. Several years later, in 1961, a $1 million grant from the Astor Foundation enabled Union Settlement and six other settlement houses to implement the Pre-Teen Delinquency Prevention Project. In 1965, Union Settlement became the site of one of the country's first Head Start Programs, the federally sponsored preschool initiative launched as one of the Great Society undertakings. 

With more recent history, Settlement Health and Medical Services, part of a 1974 federal initiative, provided primary health care to East Harlem residents in a free-standing clinic. The program is separately incorporated in 1976. In 1992, Union Settlement was selected to serve as the lead agency of the East Harlem HIV Care Network, a coalition of over 100 social and health service agencies that address issues of AIDS. Network members serve people who are HIV positive or are living with HIV/AIDS, and their relatives and partners

Union Settlement celebrated its 125th year in operation in 2020. In wake of the COVID-19 pandemic, Union Settlement helped provide vaccination services to many East Harlem residents.

Programs
Union Settlement provides a variety of community and individual services to the community in East Harlem, including:
 Early childhood services: six childcare/Head Start centers and Family Childcare Network, pediatric asthma initiative—serving one-sixth of all childcare services in East Harlem.
 Youth services: after-school and summer programs, computer classes, tutoring, sexual literacy instruction, college readiness program, dance, theater, healthy living, counseling, workforce development (includes Rising Stars Program and Bridges)
 Adult education: basic education in Spanish and English, English for Speakers of Other Languages, civics, GED preparation, citizenship and computer classes, Writing Through Reading Program, home health aide training program
 Senior services: five senior centers, Meals on Wheels, senior volunteer program, transportation program, senior fitness program
 Mental health: individual, group and family counseling and psychotherapy, crisis intervention, school-based mental health services clinics, early childhood mental health services
 Small business development: business education, technology training and technical assistance for entrepreneurs and small business owners, as well as access to capital and additional resources/information
 Community outreach: annual street fair, cultural celebrations, garden activities, free tax preparation

Notable board members
Reginald Auchincloss (1916-1921), member of prominent Auchincloss family.
Kate Buford (1999-Present), American author and biographer.
Henry Sloane Coffin (1941-1954), former president of the Union Theological Seminary.
Lorraine Cortés-Vázquez (Advisory Council), former Secretary of State of New York.
William Adams Delano (1898-1914), an American architect and partner in Delano & Aldrich.
Cleveland Hoadley Dodge (1898-1902), a businessman, investor, and philanthropist.
Edward Harkness (1902-1921), prominent philanthropist of the Commonwealth Fund and heir to the Standard Oil fortune.
Robert A. Jaffray (1898-1924), missionary to China, Indonesia and several other countries, with the Christian & Missionary Alliance.
Henry Harris Jessup (1898-1906), Presbyterian missionary.
Ulric Haynes (1976), diplomat, lawyer and university professor. US Ambassador to Algeria.
George A. Hirsch (1973-1980), magazine publisher, a founder of the New York City Marathon, politician and commentator.
Bevis Longstreth (1963-1973), writer, lawyer, and former Commissioner of the United States Securities and Exchange Commission (SEC).
Walter Lord (1963-2002), lawyer, advertising executive, author, and popular historian.
Arthur Cushman McGiffert (1920-1926), theologian.
Stanley Rogers Resor (1956-1980), former Secretary of the Army.
John Eyre Sloane (1923), industrialist.
Orville Schell (1952-1966), an American writer, academic, and activist. 
Cyrus Vance (1952-1977), former Secretary of State.
Harry F. Ward (1919-1924), Methodist minister and first chairman of the ACLU.

References

External links
  
 A timeline of Union Settlement’s history and historic photographs 
  A guide to archive holdings at the Rare Book & Manuscript Library, Columbia University, with a "Biographical Note" about Union Settlement's history.

Settlement houses in New York City
Organizations based in New York City